John Hanna Farm is a historic home located in East Fallowfield Township, Chester County, Pennsylvania. It was built about 1819, and is a two-story, five bay, stone farmhouse with a gable roof in a vernacular Federal style.  It features a formal main entrance with pediment, pilasters, and elliptical fanlight.  Also on the property is a contributing barn.

It was added to the National Register of Historic Places in 1985.

References

Houses on the National Register of Historic Places in Pennsylvania
Federal architecture in Pennsylvania
Houses completed in 1819
Houses in Chester County, Pennsylvania
National Register of Historic Places in Chester County, Pennsylvania